New Hampshire wine refers to wine made from grapes grown in the U.S. state of New Hampshire.  The wine industry in New Hampshire began in 1994 when two wineries, Jewell Towne Vineyards and Flag Hill Winery, each produced their first vintages from locally grown grapes. Candia Vineyards started their test plantings in 1992, and full planting in 1998. New Hampshire continues to be growing wine-producing state, with new commercial wineries opening. The state currently has no American Viticultural Areas.

See also

 American wine
 List of wineries in New England

References

 
Wine regions of the United States by state